42nd parallel may refer to:

42nd parallel north, a circle of latitude in the Northern Hemisphere
42nd parallel south, a circle of latitude in the Southern Hemisphere
The 42nd Parallel, a 1930 novel by John Dos Passos in his U.S.A. trilogy